Ja'fari is a surname commonly associated with descendants of Ja'far al-Sadiq, an important Muslim scholar and the 6th Shia Imam. In South Asia, Persia and the Levant, those of this genealogy, also often take the honorific title of Sayyid. Descendants of Ja'far al-Sadiq can most commonly be found amongst the Shi'i of Iraq, Iran and the Indian subcontinent. Some Sunni Muslims also associate with the surname Ja’fari.

Variant transliterations include Ja'fari, Jaafari, Jafari, Jafri, Jafry, and Jaffrey.

Notable people with the surname

Jafari
Afshin Jafari, known as Afshin (born 1978), Iranian pop singer and songwriter
Ali Jafari, Iranian computer scientist
Azra Jafari (born 1978), Afghani politician, mayor of Nili, the capital of Daykundi Province in Afghanistan
Bashar Jaafari, Syrian diplomat
Davoud Danesh-Jafari (born 1954), Iranian politician, Minister of Economy and Finance Affairs
Hadi Jafari (born 1982), Iranian footballer
Ibrahim al-Jaafari (born 1947), Iraqi politician, Prime Minister of Iraq
Kamal Aljafari (born 1972), Palestinian filmmaker
Jonathan Aryan Jafari, known as JonTron (born 1990), American comedian, internet personality, and video game critic
Mehran Jafari (born 1985), Iranian footballer
Mohammad Ali Jafari (born 1957), Iranian military figure, commander of the Army of the Guardians of the Islamic Revolution in Iran
Mohammad-Taqi Ja'fari (1923-1998), Iranian scholar, thinker, and theologian

Jafri
Ali Sardar Jafri (1913–2000), Urdu writer, poet, critic and film lyricist from India 
Aqeel Jafri (born 1957), Pakistani writer, poet and architect
Ehsan Jafri  (1929–2002), Indian Muslim parliamentarian
Husain Mohammad Jafri (born 1938), Chairman of Islamic Pakistan Study Centre, Aga Khan University of Karachi, Pakistan
Syed Aminul Hasan Jafri (born 1955), Indian journalist and politician
Zamir Jafri (1916–1999), Pakistani poet
Family of khadim hussain jafri and son’s 
 SAJID Ali jafri bin khadim hussain jafri poet آلِ بيت and his brother,s 
 Bashir hussain jafri 
Rasheed hussain jafri
khalid pervaiz hussain jafri
sajid Ali jafri
Khurram Abbas shah jafri
 Ali Raza shah jafri
 Mansoor Abbas Shah jafri
 Sudaif Akber shah jafri
 Shaor Haider shah jafri
 Muhammad khalid bin Mansoor shah jafri
 Hasnain bin Mansoor shah jafri
 Haider bin Ali Raza shah jafri
 MANNAL Jafri D/0 Khurram Abbas Jafri
 BASHAIR Jafri D/O Khurram Abbas Jafri
 ZAINAB D/o ALI RAZA Jafri

Jaffry
Waqar Jaffry (born 1980), Pakistani academician and scientist

Jaffrey
Saeed Jaffrey (born 1929), Indian-born British actor
Madhur Jaffrey (born 1933), Indian actress and food writer
Javed Jaffrey (born 1963), Indian dancer
Raza Jaffrey (born 1975), British actor and singer
Sakina Jaffrey (born 1962), Indian-American actress

Notable people with the middle name
Masoud Jafari Jozani (born 1948), Iranian film director, screenwriter and film producer

See also
 Ja'far
 Jafar (disambiguation)
 Ja'fari jurisprudence, the school of jurisprudence (fiqh) in Twelver and Isma'ili Shia Islam, named after the sixth Imam, Ja'far al-Sadiq
 Ja'far al-Sadiq, an 8th-century Muslim scholar and scientist

Islamic culture
Hashemite people
Pakistani people of Arab descent
Muslim communities of India
Shi'ite surnames